Wang Ji'en (died  999), previously Zhang Dejun, was an eunuch and a military general during imperial China's Later Zhou and the following Song dynasty.

Under Later Zhou
Wang Ji'en was born in Shanzhou (modern Shan County, Henan). His original surname was Wang, but his adoptive father Gentleman Zhang named him Zhang Dejun. He was one of the higher-ranked eunuch during the reign of Chai Rong, the second emperor of the Later Zhou.

Under the Song dynasty

During Emperor Taizu's reign
As he requested to change his surname back to his ancestral surname, Emperor Taizu of Song named him Wang Ji'en.

During Emperor Taizong's reign

During Emperor Zhenzong's reign

Notes and references

Sources
  

Later Zhou people
Song dynasty eunuchs